Dennis Trevor Peck (25 May 1938 — 14 May 2014) was a Welsh professional footballer. After playing for Llanelli, he joined Cardiff City in February 1958 where he made his professional debut. He spent six seasons with the club, largely as a reserve, before moving into non-league football with Worcester City and Kettering Town.

Early life
Born in Llanelli on 25 May 1938, Peck was one of ten children.

Club career
He began his career with his hometown club Llanelli before joining Football League Second Division side Cardiff City in February 1958, where his wages were around £15 a week and he considered himself "a pretty wealthy chap." However, soon after signing for the club, he was called up to complete his national service which led to his debut for the club coming two years later, playing in a 2–1 victory over Swansea Town in the Welsh Cup on 25 February 1960. He made his league debut two months later, in a 1–0 victory over Stoke City in place of Danny Malloy.

However, in the following three seasons Peck remained in the club's reserve side, making only one appearance for Cardiff in a 2–0 victory over French side Lens in the Anglo-Franco-Scottish Friendship Cup. He eventually broke into the first team but was used largely as cover, his most prominent season coming in 1964–65 when he made 23 appearances in all competitions. However, he was released by the club in 1965 and joined Worcester City. In October 1968, he joined Kettering Town where he went on to make over 250 appearances and was named the club's Player of the Year in 1972 before leaving in May 1974.

Career statistics

References

1938 births
2014 deaths
Footballers from Llanelli
Welsh footballers
Cardiff City F.C. players
Worcester City F.C. players
Kettering Town F.C. players
English Football League players
Association football defenders